The Mother of Believers (Umm al mu'minin) title give in the Quran and this is a title that refers to the wives of the Islamic prophet, Muhammad. The study report of the Islamic Research Center states that it is celebrated on the 10th day of Ramadan all over the world.

Khadijah surely ranks at the top. She is the first of the Mother of Believers, the title of veneration and respect given to all the wives of Muhammad, and has the unique position of not only being the first woman, but also the first person, to embrace Islam.

See also
 Muhammad's wives
 Muhammad

References

Wives of Muhammad
Muslim female saints